The 1926 College Basketball All-Southern Team consisted of basketball players from the South chosen at their respective positions.

All-Southerns

Guards
Artie Newcombe, North Carolina (AJ)
Paul Jenkins, Kentucky (AJ)

Forwards
Jack Cobb, North Carolina (AJ)
Earl Johnson, Mississippi A&M (AJ)

Center
H. L. Stone, Mississippi A&M (AJ)

Key
AJ = selected by sportswriters in the Atlanta Journal.

References

All-Southern